The Dismissal or the Australian constitutional crisis of 1975 is an event during which Prime Minister Gough Whitlam was dismissed.

The Dismissal may also refer to:
 The Dismissal (miniseries), a 1983 television miniseries
The Dismissal (musical), a 2021 musical comedy with music and lyrics by Laura Murphy and a book by Blake Erickson and Jay James-Moody
"The Dismissal" (Dynasty), a 1986 episode of Dynasty
 Die Entlassung or The Dismissal, a 1942 German film by Wolfgang Liebeneiner
 New South Wales constitutional crisis, 1932, the dismissal of Premier Jack Lang

See also
 Dismissal (disambiguation)